Craig William Clay (born 5 May 1992) is an English professional footballer who plays as a central midfielder for  club Leyton Orient.

Club career

Chesterfield
Clay was born in Nottingham, Nottinghamshire. He started his career with Chesterfield's youth system in 2008 and was part of the team that won the Youth League. He was named Chesterfield's Young Player of the Year for the 2008–09 season. His first involvement with the first team came as an unused substitute in a League Two match against Torquay United on 16 January 2010. He made the bench on a number occasions through the rest of 2009–10, but did not make an appearance.

He signed a two-year professional contract with Chesterfield in June 2010. He made his debut for the club on 18 September 2010, in a 3–0 home win over Cheltenham Town, replacing Mark Allott in the 85th minute. On 2 October 2010, he scored his first professional goal with a 25-yard shot during stoppage time to earn a 5–5 draw at home to Crewe Alexandra. On 28 October 2010, Clay joined Conference Premier club Barrow on a one-month loan with Chesterfield teammate Tendayi Darikwa. His only appearance for Barrow came two days later, in a 5–0 defeat away to Rushden & Diamonds. He made four appearances and scored one goal for Chesterfield in 2010–11, in which the club was promoted to League One as League Two champions.

Clay was loaned out by Chesterfield for a second time on 20 January 2012, joining Conference Premier club Alfreton Town on a one-month loan. Four days later, he scored Alfreton's third goal in a 3–0 win away to Bath City on his debut with a shot from the edge of the penalty area in the 90th minute. Clay finished the loan with one goal in four appearances. He made one more appearance for Chesterfield before the end of 2011–12, which he finished with eight appearances as the club was relegated to League Two in 22nd place.

He signed a new one-year contract with Chesterfield in May 2012. His only goal of 2012–13 came in a 6–1 win over League One team Hartlepool United in the FA Cup first round on 3 November 2012. Clay had a double hernia operation in March 2013 and after returning made one more appearance before the end of the season, as an 89th-minute substitute in a 2–0 victory away to Barnet on 6 April. He was released by Chesterfield on 29 April 2013 after making 23 appearances and scoring one goal in 2012–13.

York City

Clay signed for League Two club York City on 17 May 2013 on a two-year contract. He made his debut in a 1–0 home win over Northampton Town on 3 August 2013, in the first match of 2013–14. Having made 10 appearances for York, Clay left the club by mutual consent on 13 January 2014, along with Jamal Fyfield.

FC Halifax Town and Worksop Town
He signed for Conference Premier club FC Halifax Town on 16 January 2014 on a one-month contract and made his debut two days later in a 1–1 home draw with Cambridge United. After making four appearances for the club he was released on 24 February 2014. Nearly a month later, Clay signed for Northern Premier League Premier Division club Worksop Town on 21 March 2014. He made his debut the following day as an 84th-minute substitute for Shane Clarke in a 2–0 away win over Stafford Rangers.

Grimsby Town
Clay signed for Conference Premier club Grimsby Town on 28 July 2014 on a one-year contract, having spent the pre-season on trial. On 15 May 2016, he started for Grimsby as they beat Forest Green Rovers 3–1 at Wembley Stadium in the 2016 National League play-off Final. This meant Grimsby were promoted to League Two, after a six-year absence from the Football League. Clay was released when his contract expired at the end of the 2015–16 season.

Motherwell
Upon his release from Grimsby, Clay joined South African Premier Division club Bidvest Wits on trial. Clay then joined Scottish Premiership club Motherwell on trial, playing the full 90 minutes in a 3–0 victory over East Stirlingshire in the Scottish League Cup on 26 July 2016. Clay made his league debut on 6 August 2016 in a 2–1 victory away to Kilmarnock, before signing a two-year contract with the club on 10 August. He scored his first goal for the club on 28 December 2016, in a 2–1 win away to Inverness Caledonian Thistle.

Leyton Orient
Clay signed for newly relegated National League club Leyton Orient on 17 July 2017 on a two-year contract.

International career
Clay made his debut for the England C national team as a substitute in their 2–0 away win over Ukraine under-20s in the International Challenge Trophy on 22 March 2016.

Career statistics

Honours
Grimsby Town
National League play-offs: 2016
FA Trophy runner-up: 2015–16

Leyton Orient
National League: 2018–19
FA Trophy runner-up: 2018–19

Individual
Chesterfield Young Player of the Year: 2008–09
Grimsby Town Young Player of the Year: 2014–15

References

External links

Profile at the Leyton Orient F.C. website

1992 births
Living people
Footballers from Nottingham
English footballers
England semi-pro international footballers
Association football midfielders
Chesterfield F.C. players
Barrow A.F.C. players
Alfreton Town F.C. players
York City F.C. players
FC Halifax Town players
Worksop Town F.C. players
Grimsby Town F.C. players
Motherwell F.C. players
Leyton Orient F.C. players
English Football League players
National League (English football) players
Northern Premier League players
Scottish Professional Football League players